{{DISPLAYTITLE:Les Fusiliers du St-Laurent}}

Les Fusiliers du St-Laurent is a Primary Reserve infantry regiment of the Canadian Army. It was first raised in 1869 but also perpetuates the 4th Battalion, Select Embodied Militia, from the War of 1812. From 1954 to 1968, as a reserve regiment, it also was given a subsidiary title as the 5th Battalion of the Van Doos. This association was ended in 1968.

The regiment is based in Rimouski, Quebec.

Lineage

Les Fusiliers du St-Laurent 

 Originated on 9 April 1869, in Rivière du Loup, Quebec, as The Provisional Battalion of Temiscouata
 Amalgamated on 12 January 1883, with The Provisional Battalion of Rimouski and Redesignated as the 89th Témiscouata and Rimouski Battalion of Infantry
 Redesignated on 8 May 1900, as the 89th Temiscouata and Rimouski Regiment
 Redesignated on 29 March 1920, as Le Régiment Témiscouata and Rimouski
 Redesignated on 1 October 1920, as Les Fusiliers du St. Laurent
 Redesignated on 1 May 1922, as the Fusiliers du St. Laurent
 Redesignated on 3 January 1942, as the 2nd (Reserve) Battalion, Fusiliers du St. Laurent
 Redesignated on 1 June 1945, as the Fusiliers du St. Laurent
 Amalgamated on 1 September 1954, with Le Régiment de Montmagny and Redesignated as Les Fusiliers du St-Laurent (5th Battalion, Royal 22e Régiment)
 Redesignated on 9 November 1963, as Les Fusiliers du St-Laurent (5e Bataillon, Royal 22e Régiment)
 Redesignated on 1 April 1968, as Les Fusiliers du St-Laurent

The Provisional Battalion of Rimouski 

 Originated on 9 April 1869, in Rimouski, Quebec, as The Provisional Battalion of Rimouski
 Amalgamated on 12 January 1883, with The Provisional Battalion of Temiscouata and Redesignated as the 89th Témiscouata and Rimouski Battalion of Infantry

Le Régiment de Montmagny 

 Originated on 9 April 1869, in Montmagny, Quebec, as The Battalion of Montmagny and l'Islet
 Redesignated on 5 November 1869, as the 61st Montmagny and l'Islet Battalion
 Redesignated on 8 May 1900, as the 61st Montmagny and l'Islet Regiment
 Redesignated on 1 August 1902, as the 61st Régiment de Montmagny
 Redesignated on 29 March 1920, as Le Régiment de Montmagny
 Redesignated on 15 March 1942, as the 2nd (Reserve) Battalion, Le Régiment de Montmagny
 Redesignated on 1 June 1945, as Le Régiment de Montmagny
 Amalgamated on 1 September 1954, with Les Fusiliers du St-Laurent and Redesignated as Les Fusiliers du St-Laurent (5th Battalion, Royal 22e Régiment)

Lineage Chart 
Lineage chart of les Fusiliers du St-Laurent:

The regiment celebrated 150 years of continuous service in 2019.

Perpetuations

War of 1812 

 4th Battalion, Select Embodied Militia
 2nd Militia Light Infantry Battalion
 Canadian Chasseurs

The Great War 

 189th (Canadien-Français) Battalion, CEF

Operational History

The First World War 
On 6 August 1914, Details of the 89th Temiscouata and Rimouski Regiment were placed on active service for local protection duties.

On 15 July 1916, the 189th (Canadien-Français) Battalion, CEF was authorized for service and on 27 September 1916, the battalion embarked for Great Britain. After its arrival in the UK, on 6 October 1916, the battalion's personnel were absorbed by the 69th Battalion (Canadien-Français), CEF to provide reinforcements for the Canadian Corps in the field. On 8 December 1917, the 189th Battalion, CEF was disbanded.

Organization

Le Régiment Témiscouata and Rimouski (01 November, 1920) 

 1st Battalion (perpetuating the 189th Battalion, CEF)
 2nd (Reserve) Battalion

Fusiliers du St. Laurent (01 May, 1922) 

 Regimental Headquarters (Rimouski, Quebec)
 A Company (Rivière-du-Loup, Quebec)
 B Company (Rimouski, Quebec)
 C Company (Mont-Joli, Quebec)
 D Company (Rimouski, Quebec)

Fusiliers du St. Laurent (2023) 

 Regimental Headquarters (Rimouski)
 A Company (Rivière-du-Loup)
 B Company (Rimouski)
 C Company (Matane, Quebec)

Alliances
 - The Royal Northumberland Fusiliers (Until 1968)
 - The Royal Regiment of Fusiliers

Battle Honours 
The regiment, and the older units it perpetuates, have rendered front line service in three conflicts. All four battle honours are emblazoned on the regimental colours.

War of 1812 

 Defence of Canada – 1812–1815 – Défense du Canada
 Châteauguay

The Great War 

 Arras, 1917

Afghanistan 

 Afghanistan

Notable Members 

 Lieutenant Jean Brillant 
 Major-General Sir Marie-Joseph-Eugène Fiset

Armoury

Order of precedence

See also

 The Canadian Crown and the Canadian Forces
 Military history of Canada
 History of the Canadian Army
 Canadian Forces
 List of armouries in Canada

References

External links
 

Fusilier regiments of Canada
Infantry regiments of Canada in World War II
Military units and formations of Quebec
Rimouski
Military units and formations established in 1869